Fedaia Lake is a lake in Trentino and the Province of Belluno, Italy.

Lakes of Trentino-Alto Adige/Südtirol
Lakes of Italy
Marmolada